Sindhi Adabi Sangat is an organization of the writers of Sindhi language that has branches in Sindh, Pakistan and abroad as well. Because of its great number and well-built organization, it is considered as the biggest Adabi Tanzeem (literary organization) of Asia.

It was in 1952 that Abdul Ghafoor Ansari and Nooruddin Sarki coined in Sindhi Adabi Sangat. It initially was restricted to literary activities in Karachi. However, envied by the circles it soon multiplied to have branches all over Sindh and has now branches oversees as well.

In 1952, Noor-ud-din Sarki and Abdul Ghafoor Ansari restructured the literary forum of Sindhi language and called it Sindhi Adabi Sangat. Initially its activities were confined to the city of Karachi. Inspired by the success of its activities in Karachi, interest developed over the rest of Sindh.  This led to the launch of other branches in other parts of Sindh as well.

Realizing the growing popularity of Sindhi Adabi Sangat, it was invited for the first time as a group in the 'Eighteenth Sindhi Adabi Conference' in April 1956 at Larkana by Jamait-ul-shoora-e-Sindh. Taking the advantage of the opportunity, the Sangat called upon the friends for the central organization of the Sangat. That is how Sindhi Adabi Sangat formed at the central level in 1956 with Ayaz Qadri as its Secretary and its report was published in quarterly Mehran. There are two opinions as regards the origin of Sindhi Adabi Sangat: some believe that the group in the first place was formed before the independence of Pakistan in 1947, while the others suggest that it started after the independence.

A report published in the August 1947 issue of the monthly magazine Naeen Dunya, mentioned that: a meeting of Sindhi writers' was called at 'Babrs Shippers chamber' on last Sunday. The meeting was presided over by Prof. M.U Malkani where among many other writers were present the literary veterans like Lal Chand Dino Mal, Aasanand Mamtura, Chohar Mal Hinduja, Manohar Das Koromal, Jeratti Subani, Sobho Gianchandani, Gobind Malhi, Bihari Chabra, Anand Golani, Kerith Babani, Mohan Punjabi, and Bhagwan Lalvani. It is believed that Ghobind Malhi was the first secretary to Sindhi Adabi Sangat which was formed during March–April 1947. However, it did not survive the independence of Pakistan.

Dr Mushtaque Hussain Phull,Taj Baloch, Shamsherul Haidri, Anwar Pirzado, [[Abdul Rehman Pirzado]. (Mukhtiar malak], Ayaz Gul, Ghulam Hussain Rangrez, Dr. Shams soomroYousif Sindhi, Dr Zulfiqar Siyal, Dr Adal Soomro and Taj Joyo have been active members of Sangat in sixties, seventies and eighties. Nintees and also some of them till now. 

Whatever the case be, Sindhi Adabi Sangat in its present form commenced in 1952.
Well known poet and writer Dr.Mushtaq Phul remained 3 times continuesly secretary General of Sangat, Sindh wef 2010 to August 2017.
After that Ahmed Solangi was elected in August 2017 but due to internal organisational differences he was terminated in Saeed abad sindh Council meeting and Dr Zulfiqar Siyal look after the charge of secretary General.
In 2019 Mr Paryal Dayo was elected and hold the charge of Sindhi Adabi Sangat as secretary General.
0n 26th of November 2022 again Dr. Mushtaq phul  honoured to be elected 4th time  as Secretary General of Sindhi Adabi Sagat, Sindh for next two years.
Dr. Phul have connected the Sangat through Sangat online yu tube, Sindhi Adabi Sangat official page, sangat Radio weekly program  with the other literary organisation and also with other languages writers. Dr. Mushtaq phul secretary General of Sindhi Adabi Sangat sindh is the editor of sangat publication.

External links

Sindhi-language writers
Pakistan